Tomasz Borowski (born 15 April 1970) is a Polish boxer. He competed in the men's middleweight event at the 1996 Summer Olympics.

References

External links
 

1970 births
Living people
Polish male boxers
Olympic boxers of Poland
Boxers at the 1996 Summer Olympics
People from Grójec
AIBA World Boxing Championships medalists
Middleweight boxers
21st-century Polish people
20th-century Polish people